Showbiz Lingo (later Showbiz Lingo Plus) was a Philippine weekly entertainment news and talk show. It was first broadcast on August 2, 1992, replacing Junior Patrol, under the name Showbiz Lingo and on May 11, 1997, after a reformat, as Showbiz Lingo Plus. It was the popular Sunday afternoon talk show on ABS-CBN for almost 7 years until it aired its final episode on June 6, 1999. It featured local celebrity gossip and news, and later would be replaced by The Buzz which would be the longest running talk show of the network for almost 16 years.

Cast

Main Hosts
Cristy Fermin (1992-1999)
Butch Francisco (1992-1997; 1998)
Christine Bersola-Babao (1995-1997)
Edu Manzano (1997-1998)
Roderick Paulate (1998-1999)

Kris Aquino (pinch-hitter of Cristy Fermin, 1992-1995; 1996-1999)

Segment Presenters

Ogie Diaz (1992-1999)
John Lapus (1992-1999)
Pilar Mateo (1997-1999)
Aster Amoyo (1997-1999)
Dolly Anne Carvajal (1997-1999)

History

As Showbiz Lingo (1992-1997) 
When the show Rumors: Facts and Humors (spearheaded by Alfie Lorenzo) ended in 1988, ABS-CBN premiered three other showbiz talk shows as its predecessors,  Showbiz na Showbiz (1986-1987), Sine Sine, a comedy inspired talk show (1988), and Cinemascoop, a 60 minutes daily late afternoon entertainment news talk show before TV Patrol as a pre-programmed show (hosted by Boy de Guia) (1988), which did not last long. The network conceptualized a new talk show that would be popular with a large audience. Four years later as part of the major change and transition in Philippine television, the management decided to formulate a showbiz-oriented talk show. Showbiz Lingo premiered on August 2, 1992, on a Sunday. It was originally hosted by film reviewer and entertainment columnist Butch Francisco and entertainment columnist Cristy Fermin. Ogie Diaz and John Lapus (a researcher for the show) were introduced as the first reporters; Diaz and Lapus later would co-host the program.

The show's concept was similar to its predecessor, Rumors: Facts and Humors, wherein the hosts presented the latest showbiz news, controversies and intrigues.  Showbiz Lingo built on the concept and added interviews with the stars in a live-panel discussion.

Christine Bersola, who was then the anchor of Star News, a segment of ABS-CBN's flagship newscast TV Patrol, joined the show in 1995 as a co-host for two years.

As Showbiz Lingo Plus (1997-1999) 
In a reformat, the show's name was changed to Showbiz Lingo Plus on May 11, 1997, and the opening segment was presented by three showbiz writers, Pilar Mateo, Aster Amoyo and Dolly Anne Carvajal, daughter of veteran showbiz reporter Inday Badiday. They joined Butch and Cristy as the team of reporters. Bersola left the show at that time to focus hosting the morning show Alas Singko Y Medya. Francisco left the show as well in 1997 to migrate to the United States.  He was replaced by Edu Manzano, who left after one season due to his ongoing term as vice mayor of Makati City (He was elected in 1998).  Roderick Paulate came on board as Fermin's co-host and stayed on until the last show episode.

The show plummeted in the ratings for the Sunday afternoon slot in 1995 when rival network GMA premiered Startalk hosted by Lolit Solis, Boy Abunda and Kris Aquino. Startalk surpassed Showbiz Lingo in the ratings for a time, but after Aquino left Startalk in 1996, and after reformatting, Showbiz Lingo regained top-rating status. Startalk was moved to the Saturday afternoon slot; it was replaced on Sunday by S-Files, hosted by Paolo Bediones and Lyn Ching, which earned good reviews as well as the 1999 PMPC Star Awards for Television for Best Showbiz Show.

Showbiz Lingo Plus aired its last episode on June 6, 1999. The management tapped former "Startalk" host Boy Abunda to host its new entertainment show, The Buzz.  Cristy Fermin's daily solo talk show, Cristy Per Minute was discontinued months after Showbiz Lingo Plus ended its run. Butch Francisco was later hired as Abunda's replacement on Startalk.

References

See also
List of programs broadcast by ABS-CBN

Philippine television talk shows
ABS-CBN original programming
1992 Philippine television series debuts
1999 Philippine television series endings
1990s Philippine television series
Entertainment news shows in the Philippines
Filipino-language television shows